Metasphenisca micrura is a species of tephritid or fruit flies in the genus Metasphenisca of the family Tephritidae.

Distribution
Kenya, Tanzania.

References

Tephritinae
Insects described in 1942
Diptera of Africa